Richard Taylor (1902–1970) was a Canadian cartoonist best known for his cartoons in the magazine The New Yorker and in Playboy.  He signed his work R.Taylor.  Canadian comics historian John Bell called Taylor "one of the greatest New Yorker cartoonists".

Taylor was born in 1902 in Fort William, Ontario, in Canada.  In the 1920s, he contributed to Toronto-based publications; he contributed for a year to Toronto Telegram newspaper, from 1927 to the University of Toronto's humour magazine The Goblin, and the Communist Party of Canada newspaper The Worker.  Aside from cartooning, he produced commercial art and in his spare time painted.  In 1935, The New Yorker began publishing his work, and he thereafter moved to the United States, where there were more opportunities for better pay for cartoonists. He married Maxine MacTavish in Toronto, Ontario and they had no children  Taylor died in West Redding, Connecticut, in the United States in 1970 of prostate cancer. The National Gallery of Canada has been gifted the vast majority of his lifetime's works.

References

Works cited

Further reading

 

1902 births
1970 deaths
Canadian cartoonists
The New Yorker cartoonists
Canadian emigrants to the United States